is a Japanese video game music composer and musician, who has contributed to Virtua Fighter, Tobal 2, Ehrgeiz, the Lumines series, and Rodea the Sky Soldier. He is the director of Brainstorm Co. Ltd., along with being the publisher of video game music albums including "LUMINES remixes winter" and "L.II remixes".

Works

References

External links
Official website 
Official blog 
Siliconera interview with Takayuki Nakamura
Rocketbaby interview with Takayuki Nakamura

1967 births
Japanese composers
Japanese male composers
Japanese male musicians
Living people
Musicians from Tokyo
Sega people
Video game composers